Aladdin and the Wonderful Lamp is a 1917 silent film fantasy  directed by Chester and Sidney Franklin  and produced and distributed by Fox Film Corporation.

It is preserved in the George Eastman House, Cinemateca Do Museu De Arte Moderna and the Library of Congress.

The Film

Cast
 Francis Carpenter - Aladdin
 F. A. Turner - Mustapha, A Tailor (*as Fred Turner)
 Virginia Lee Corbin - The Princess Badr al-Budur
 Alfred Paget - The Sultan
 Violet Radcliffe -al Talib, The Worker of Magic
 Buddy Messinger - Omar, Slave of the Magician and a Diviner of the Future
 Lewis Sargent - Ali, The Camel-Driver
 Gertrude Messinger - Yasmini, Sister of Ali and Hand Maiden to the Princess
 Marie Messinger - Dancing Girl
 Carmen De Rue - Dancing Girl
 Raymond Lee - Boy of the Street
 Lloyd Perl - Boy of the Street
 Joe Singleton - Muezzin
 Elmo Lincoln - The Genie
 Teddy Billings - Sullivan

References

External links
 
 

1917 films
American silent feature films
Films based on Aladdin
Films directed by Sidney Franklin
American black-and-white films
Articles containing video clips
American fantasy films
1910s fantasy films
Surviving American silent films
Fox Film films
1910s American films
Silent horror films